Salomé is a 1922 silent film directed by Charles Bryant and starring Alla Nazimova. It is an adaptation of the 1891 Oscar Wilde play of the same name. The play itself is a loose retelling of the biblical story of King Herod and his execution of John the Baptist (here, as in  Wilde's play, called Jokanaan) at the request of Herod's stepdaughter, Salomé, whom he lusts after.

Salomé is often called one of the first art films to be made in the United States. The highly stylized costumes, exaggerated acting, minimal sets, and absence of all but the most necessary props make for a screen image much more focused on atmosphere and on conveying a sense of the characters' individual heightened desires than on conventional plot development.

Plot
As described in a film magazine, during a banquet at Herod's palace, the Tetrarch (Lewis) pays too much attention to his stepdaughter Salomé (Nazimova), angering his wife Herodias (Dione). Salomé goes out into the courtyard adjoining the banquet hall and induces the soldier on guard to let her see Jokanaan (De Brulier), who is then brought up from the prison below. Salomé shows her love for the Prophet and, when he ignores her attentions, declares that she will kiss him. The price is a dance before Herod, who promises her that he will accede to any demand for the dance. Salomé asks for and gets the Prophet's head and kisses it. Herod then turns upon her and orders her killed.

Cast
 Alla Nazimova as Salomé, Stepdaughter of Herod
 Mitchell Lewis as Herod, Tetrarch of Judea
 Rose Dione as Herodias, wife of Herod
 Earl Schenck as Narraboth, Captain of the Guard
 Arthur Jasmine as Page of Herodias
 Nigel De Brulier as Jokanaan, the Prophet
 Frederick Peters as Naaman, the Executioner
 Louis Dumar as Tigellinus

Production
Despite the film being only a little over an hour in length and having no real action to speak of, it cost over $350,000 to make. All the sets were constructed indoors to be able to have complete control over the lighting. The film was shot completely in black and white, matching the illustrations done by Aubrey Beardsley in the printed edition of Wilde's play. The costumes, designed by Natacha Rambova, used material only from Maison Lewis of Paris, such as the real silver lamé loincloths worn by the guards.

No major studio would be associated with the film, and it was years after its completion before it was released, by a minor independent distributor. It was a complete failure at the time and marked the end of Nazimova's producing career.

Gay cast rumor                                                                                            
There is a longstanding rumor, which seems to have started while the film was still in production and has been asserted by chronicler of Hollywood decadence Kenneth Anger, that the film's cast is composed entirely of gay or bisexual actors in an homage to Oscar Wilde, as per star and producer Nazimova's demand. It is, of course, impossible to say, but one of the extras in Salomé reported that a number of the cast members—both featured and extras—were indeed gay, but not an unusual percentage of them, and certainly not all of them. What can be said is that Nazimova herself was usually thought of as a lesbian (despite occasional flings with men including Paul Ivano), the two guard characters (who, next to Salomé, have the most screen time) are at least played very stereotypically gay, and several of the female courtiers are men in drag.

According to Vito Russo's The Celluloid Closet, some scenes in which homosexuality was exposed more explicitly were cut out, including one showing the relationship between two Syrian soldiers.

Critical reception and legacy 
A reviewer for Screenland described Salomé as "a painting deftly stroked upon the silversheet" and that "poets and dreamers will find imaginative delights in the weird settings and the still more weird acting, depressing at times to ordinary folks. And it is worth something to watch Nazimova balance her Christmas-tree headdress!"

Salomé was screened in 1989 at the New York International Festival of Lesbian and Gay films and in 1990 at the New York Gay Experimental Film Festival.

In 2000,  the film was selected for preservation in the United States National Film Registry by the Library of Congress as being "culturally, historically, or aesthetically significant".

In 2006, Salomé became available on DVD as a double feature with the avant garde film Lot in Sodom (1933) by James Sibley Watson and Melville Webber.

In 2013 Salomé was screened at the Ojai Music Festival, where the Bad Plus performed a live improvised soundtrack.

The film was nominated  in 2001 by the American Film Institute for AFI's 100 Years...100 Passions.

In "Bali Ha'i", the sixth episode of the second season of Better Call Saul, the film poster of Salomé is shown on Kim Wexler's apartment wall.

See also
 List of films in the public domain in the United States

References

Lori K. Martin review and DVD liner notes
Salomé at the AFI/TCM database

External links

Salomé essay by Martin Turnbull at National Film Registry

 
 
Salomé essay by Daniel Eagan in America's Film Legacy: The Authoritative Guide to the Landmark Movies in the National Film Registry, A&C Black, 2010 , pages 85–86.

1923 films
1923 drama films
American LGBT-related films
American silent feature films
American black-and-white films
Films based on Salome (play)
United States National Film Registry films
Cultural depictions of John the Baptist
1920s LGBT-related films
Silent American drama films
1920s American films